Kineta may refer to:

Kineta, a town in West Attica, Greece
Kineta, Ivory Coast, a village in Ivory Coast
Kineta (skipper), a genus of skipper butterflies
Kineta (film), a 2005 Greek film